The  is the national security agency of Japan. It is administered by the Ministry of Justice in the government of Japan, and is tasked with internal security and espionage against threats to Japanese national security based on the Subversive Activities Prevention Act and the Act Regarding the Control of Organizations Which Committed Indiscriminate Mass Murder. Any investigation conducted by the agency needs to go through the Public Security Examination Commission (PSEC) in order to determine if there is a justification to investigate and clamp down on an organization's activities.

As the national agency with the role to collect intelligence information, the PSIA contributes to Japanese government policy by providing relevant organizations with necessary foreign and domestic data (collected through investigations and intelligence activities) on subversive organizations.

The PSIA's findings are released publicly through the annually-published Naigai Jousei no Kaiko to Tenbo (Situation in Public Security inside and outside Japan and their prospect) as well as regularly-published Kokusai Terrorism Youran (International Terrorism Report).

History

The Public Security Intelligence Agency was established with the enforcement of the Subversive Activities Prevention Law on 21 July 1952, initially known as the Public Security Investigation Agency before it changed to its current name. The PSIA took over the role of the SIB, which was established by the Allied Forces during the occupation. Most of the recruits came from the disbanded Tokumu Kikan and led by officials from the pre-occupation Ministry of Justice.

Initially focusing on threats from far left groups such as the Japanese Red Army during the days of the Cold War, it began to conduct intelligence work on the Aum Shinrikyo after the Sarin gas attack on the Tokyo subway in 1995, with criticism that the PSIA did not monitor the group, especially with their attempt to acquire and stockpile biological weapons on Japanese soil. The PSIA had cooperated with the Tokyo Metropolitan Police Department Public Security Bureau in investigating Aum Shinrikyo for a number of years. When asked about their investigation on the cult, a PSIA report had said "There has been no change in its dangerous nature. Strict surveillance is essential."

The PSIA had investigated Aum Shinrikyo when it was revealed that the group had established software firms that could pose security risks to Japan.

Chongryon has been under PSIA surveillance for a long time, suspecting it of supposedly performing espionage activities in Japanese soil. The Ministry of Justice has sought ¥270 million to fund the PSIA on conducting intelligence against North Korean espionage activities. Its facilities were also raided by the PSIA while sentencing for its leaders were underway in 2004.

The PSIA had been supposed to be integrated with Naicho in order to reorient the agency to a post-Cold War and to enhance its resources, but the proposal was not adopted.

An investigation into French Al-Qaeda terrorist Lionel Dumont had been the responsibility of the PSIA in 2004 based on rumors that he was supposed to establish a Japanese Al-Qaeda cell. The PSIA raided the headquarters of Fumihiro Joyu's Hikari no Wa on May 10, 2007. Despite insistence from Joyu that his group had ended ties with Aum Shinrikyo, PSIA officials have warned that his group has ties to Shoko Asahara after conducting raids.

In the wake of Kim Jong-il's death in 2011, the PSIA reported that they are undertaking intelligence work on North Korea by conducting intelligence work towards Chongryon, as they had remitted money and gifts to North Korea before sanctions were imposed.

In 2015, the PSIA offered university students a one-day immersion to work alongside veteran PSIA officers.

On July 14, 2016, the PSIA sent officers to Sapporo to investigate Aleph's Shiroshi Ward facility under the Act on the Control of Organizations Which Have Committed Acts of Indiscriminate Mass Murder.

In January 2017, Okinawa press reported that the PSIA has conducted investigation into pro-Okinawan independence and anti-USFJ bases activist groups for potential links to China.

In December 2019, an anti-Aum Shinrikyo video was created by the agency in order to raise public awareness that the group is still a threat to public safety.

In recent years, the PSIA is eyed as the basis for the creation of a new foreign intelligence agency should the prime minister go through with plans.

Operations
While the PSIA is known to conduct its operations on domestic soil, there are suggestions that they have conducted limited operations overseas.

In the 2000s, the PSIA was reported to have conducted undercover operations at the Chinese-North Korean border by distributing flyers to locals in obtaining information regarding Japanese nationals abducted by North Korea.

In 2003, it was reported that the PSIA had a mole inside Aum Shinrikyo by the name of Kazumi Kitagawa, who joined the cult after the sarin gas attack in the Tokyo Metro; she later tried to seek asylum in North Korea. She revealed to Aum about her work in the PSIA and her plans to cut ties with them after she accused a PSIA officer of raping her.

From 2005 to 2016, reports of Japanese nationals being arrested throughout China for taking photos of sensitive installations or conducting illegal activities under cover of legal occupations suggests that the PSIA has recruited expats working/living in China to conduct limited HUMINT ops. These allegations have never been officially confirmed. 

According to a National Police Agency official, the PSIA has done a bad job in China if reports do prove that the expats arrested were covertly recruited by the agency.

Organization
The PSIA is formed with the current organization:

 Internal Departments
 General Affairs Department
 Trial Office
 Planning and Coordination Office
 Information Management Office
 Public Relations and Communications Office
 Human Resources Section
 Work Promotion Office
 First Intelligence Department (Domestic Intelligence, headed by career police officer)
 Section 1 (Domestic security issues - Citizen group/s investigation, electoral information)
 Section 2 (Kakurōkyō/Revolutionary Communist League, National Committee investigation)
 Third Division (Japanese Communist Party investigation)
 Fourth Division (Right Wing group/s investigation)
 Fifth Division (Other domestic pro-left group/s investigations such as Japan Revolutionary Communist League (Revolutionary Marxist Faction))
 Aum Special Research Office
 Second Intelligence Department (Foreign Intelligence, headed by career/non-career person)
 Section 1 (Japanese Red Army and international terrorism investigation)
 Section 2 (Foreign intelligence investigation, including liaising with foreign agents stationed in Japan)
 Third Division (North Korean investigation)
 Fourth Division (China/Southeast Asia/Russia/Europe/United States investigation)
 Institute
 Training Institute (Located in Akishima)
 Regional Bureaus
 Hokkaido (Hokkaido Bureau), Miyagi (Tohoku Bureau), Tokyo (Kanto Bureau), Aichi (Chubu Bureau), Osaka (Kinki Bureau), Hiroshima (Chugoku Bureau), Kagawa (Shikoku Bureau) and Fukuoka (Kyushu Bureau)
 Public Security Intelligence Offices (Hokkaido, Iwate, Niigata, Saitama, Chiba, Kanagawa, Shizuoka, Nagano, Ishikawa, Kyoto, Hyogo, Okayama, Kumamoto and Okinawa.)

Foreign ties
The PSIA has ties to several foreign intelligence security agencies, including the CIA, FBI, Mossad, RAW and MI6, with several PSIA agents being invited to train with the CIA under its Intelligence Analysis Course.

In October 2018, Chen Wenqiang, head of the Ministry of State Security, visited the PSIA in order to collaborate on antiterrorism activities prior to the 2020 Tokyo Olympics.

Known Directors-General of PSIA
 Shigetake Ogata – 1993 to 1997, head of Harvest investment group
 Toshiro Yanagi – 2006 to 2009

Criticism
The PSIA has faced criticism in the past for being ineffective, in part because it has little ability to act without approval from the PSEC, an ad hoc body that meets only when required. According to Philip H.J. Davies and Kristian Gustafson, the PSIA operates similarly to the British security agency MI5 since officers have no rights to arrest anyone during a law enforcement operation nor force anyone to be involved in an investigation.

The criticism was especially made after public discovery that the agency did not move against Aum Shinrikyo. Due to the strict legal framework surrounding the agency it had not been given permission to monitor the organization directly until 2000, despite having requested permission from the PSEC in 1996.

See also
 Kenpeitai

Notes

References

Bibliography

External links 

 Official Website 
 Official Website (Current) 
 Official Website (Archive) 
 

Japanese intelligence agencies
Domestic intelligence agencies